The Military Security and Intelligence Agency (VSOA) is the security and intelligence service of the Croatian Armed Forces. Established with the passing of the 2006 Act on the Security Intelligence System of the Republic of Croatia (OG 79/06 and OG 105/06), the Director of the VSOA is appointed or dismissed by a joint decision made by the President of Croatia and the Prime Minister of Croatia.

Tasks 
As an organizational unit within the Croatian Ministry of Defense, the VSOA is tasked with supporting the Ministry of Defense and the Croatian Armed Forces in defending the existence, sovereignty, independence and territorial integrity of the Republic of Croatia.

The VSOA collects, analyzes, processes and evaluates information on other nations' military and defense systems, external actions that may impact Croatia's defense and security, and activities abroad aimed at endangering the country's defense and security.

Within the territorial borders of the Republic of Croatia, the VSOA provides intelligence pertaining to actions individuals, groups and organizations within the country may take in endangering the defence of the state. In addition to detecting and monitoring, the VSOA is tasked with undertaking activities to deter actions that may endanger the defence of the state.

In accordance with Article 26 and 33 of the Act on the Security Intelligence System of the Republic of Croatia, the VSOA is limited to gathering information, which may temporarily restrict certain constitutional human rights and basic freedoms, on employees or members of the Croatian Ministry of Defence and Armed Forces.

Operations

2013 Ukrainian MiG-21 Deal 
In 2016, the VSOA, in collaboration with the Military Police, investigated a multi-million Euro contract for the repair of five used Mikoyan MiG-21bis-D fighters and UMD fighter jets delivered in 2015 Ukrainian state-owned arms company Ukrspecexport. Later grounded due to safety reasons, in 2016 the Croatian Office for the Suppression of Organized Crime (USKOK) filed an indictment against two Croatian citizens, one a defence ministry employee and another employee of the company involved in the deal, citing “serious indications of troubling actions that may affect the defensive capability” of Croatia. As of February 2018, the case was with the District Court of Zagreb, which was considering a case of corruption in the repair of the aircraft in Ukraine.

Directors

 Brigadier General Ivica Kinder (2015–present)
 Lieutenant General Darko Grdić (2008–2015)
 Major General Gordan Čačić (2006–2008)

See also
 Security and Intelligence Agency (SOA)
Croatian security and intelligence system
Ministry of Defence (Croatia)
 Military of Croatia

References

Sources
 O Vojnoj sigurnosno-obavještajnoj agenciji 

Croatian intelligence agencies
Military of Croatia
Military intelligence agencies